Puerto Rico competed at the 1988 Summer Paralympics in Seoul, South Korea. 13 competitors from Puerto Rico won 3 medals including 1 gold and 2 silver and finished 36th in the medal table.

See also 
 Puerto Rico at the Paralympics
 Puerto Rico at the 1988 Summer Olympics

References 

Nations at the 1988 Summer Paralympics
1988
Summer Paralympics